The Mistral Office Tower, commonly referred to as Mistral Office or simply Mistral Tower, is a 48-floor,  tall skyscraper in İzmir, Turkey. Located in the extreme northeast corner of the Konak district, it is currently the tallest building in İzmir (the tallest building in Turkey outside of Istanbul, and the 6th tallest building in Turkey overall.) Together with the Mistral Residential Tower (38 floors / ), the Mistral Office Tower is part of the Mistral İzmir complex.

Images

References

External links
 Mistral İzmir (Official Website)
 Mistral Towers (Emporis.com)
 Mistral İzmir (Wikimedia Commons)

Buildings and structures in İzmir
Office buildings completed in 2017
Skyscraper office buildings in Turkey
2017 establishments in Turkey
Konak District
21st-century architecture in Turkey